The Bergama Acropolis Gondola is a two-station aerial lift of gondola type at Bergama district of İzmir Province in western Turkey serving the nearby archaeological site of Acropolis.

Bergama is the site of ancient Pergamon, a major tourist attraction place. A project was worked out in 2005 to connect the site Asclepium down in the valley with the  far Acropolis on the top of a steep hill north of Bergama by an aerial lift line. After rejection of this project by the responsible official body due to concerns over the conservation of the historical place, an alternate project for a much shorter route between Acropolis and its foothill north of the town found acceptance in 2006. Access to Acropolis on the narrow road by bus takes considerable time for the tourists, and any widening of the existing road is not permitted due to the archaeological status of the site.

The gondola lift was constructed by the Italian company Leitner Ropeways of Leitner Group costing 6 million, and financed by the local Turkish company Akropolis Teleferik Inc. on the build–operate–transfer base for a lease term of 49 years.

It started to operate mid May 2010, with the official opening taking place on October 14, 2010. The number of cabins each eight-seater was increased from initially nine to fifteen in 2013. The ride takes less than four minutes. The fare decreased from 10.00 to 8.00 with effect of October 2013.

The development of the number passengers in relation with the number of visitors at the site is shown in the table below:

†) in 2,5 months only.

Specifications
 Line length: 
 Height difference: 
 Number of stations: 2
 Number of cabins: 15 each eight-seater
 Trip duration: 4 minutes
 Hourly ridership: 1,200
 Fare: 8.00 
 Terminals:
 Bergama 
 Acropolis

See also
 List of gondola lifts in Turkey

References

Gondola lifts in Turkey
2010 establishments in Turkey
Transport infrastructure completed in 2010
Bergama
Tourist attractions in İzmir Province